Susan McLain is an American politician. A Democrat, she currently serves as a member of the Oregon House of Representatives from District 29, representing Cornelius, Forest Grove, and parts of Hillsboro. She served as a councilor for Metro, the regional government covering the urban portions of Clackamas, Multnomah, and Washington counties, for 16 years, first winning election in 1990. She was an unsuccessful candidate for Washington County commissioner in 2006. She was elected to the Oregon House of Representatives in 2014, defeating Republican Mark Richman.

Personal life
McLain earned a Bachelor of Science degree in teaching from the Oregon College of Education (known as Western Oregon University since April 22, 1981) in 1971. She retired in June 2014 from Glencoe High School, where she started teaching in 1980, the year the school opened. Prior to that, McLain taught at Hillsboro High School, from 1975–1980. Both schools are in the Hillsboro School District.

In 2011, McLain was awarded the Hillsboro School District's Crystal Apple Award for excellence in education. She continues to coach Glencoe High School's Speech and Debate team in her retirement.

McLain is widowed, with four children and five grandchildren. Although she taught in Hillsboro, she lives in Forest Grove with her family and attends church in Cornelius, other communities in her House district.

Political career
McLain was elected to the Oregon House of Representatives in November 2014, representing House District 29. She was sworn into the House on January 12, 2015, and appointed by House Speaker Tina Kotek to serve on four committees: the House Committee on Transportation and Economic Development, the House Committee on Education, the House Committee on Consumer Protection and Government Effectiveness, and as the Vice-Chair of the House Committee on Agriculture and Natural Resources.

References

External links
 Legislative website
 Campaign website

Living people
Democratic Party members of the Oregon House of Representatives
Metro councilors (Oregon regional government)
Politicians from Hillsboro, Oregon
People from Forest Grove, Oregon
Western Oregon University alumni
Women state legislators in Oregon
Place of birth missing (living people)
Educators from Oregon
American women educators
21st-century American politicians
21st-century American women politicians
Year of birth missing (living people)